Liu Haikuan (Chinese: 刘海宽 ; pinyin: Liú Hǎi Kuān) was born on 3 August 1994 in Jilin Province, China. He is a Chinese actor and made his on-screen debut in the 2016 drama Gamer's Generation. His more recent roles include that of Lan Xichen in the 2019 xianxia drama The Untamed.

Selected filmography

Television series

Awards

References

External links 

 
 

Chinese male television actors
Living people
21st-century Chinese male actors
Male actors from Jilin
1994 births